Forrest E. Peden (October 3, 1913 – February 3, 1945) was a United States Army soldier and a recipient of the United States military's highest decoration—the Medal of Honor—for his actions in World War II.

Biography
Peden joined the Army from Wathena, Kansas in February 1943, and by February 3, 1945, was serving as a technician fifth grade in Battery C, 10th Field Artillery Battalion, 3rd Infantry Division. On that day, near Biesheim, France, his unit was ambushed by a larger enemy force. After giving medical aid to two wounded soldiers, Peden ran for help despite intense enemy fire. He found a friendly tank and guided it to the ambush site, but was killed when the tank was hit by hostile fire. He was posthumously awarded the Medal of Honor a year later, on February 13, 1946.

Aged 31 at his death, Peden was buried at Mount Olive Cemetery in Troy, Kansas.

Medal of Honor citation
Technician Peden's official Medal of Honor citation reads:

See also

List of Medal of Honor recipients for World War II

References

 

1913 births
1945 deaths
People from St. Joseph, Missouri
United States Army personnel killed in World War II
United States Army Medal of Honor recipients
United States Army non-commissioned officers
World War II recipients of the Medal of Honor
People from Doniphan County, Kansas